There are over 20,000 Grade II* listed buildings in England. This page is a list of these buildings in the district of Barrow-in-Furness in Cumbria.

List of buildings

|}

See also
 Listed buildings in Barrow-in-Furness

Notes

External links

 
Lists of listed buildings in Cumbria
Barrow-in-Furness
Lists of Grade II* listed buildings in Cumbria